The 2014 Cork Premier Intermediate Football Championship was the ninth staging of the Cork Premier Intermediate Football Championship since its establishment by the Cork County Board in 2006. The championship began on 3 May 2014 and ended on 19 October 2014.

On 19 October 2014, Valley Rovers won the championship following a 0-12 to 0-08 defeat of Na Piarsaigh in the final at Páirc Uí Chaoimh. It was their second championship title overall and their first title since 2009.

Team changes

To Championship

Promoted from the Cork Intermediate Football Championship
 Grenagh

Relegated from the Cork Senior Football Championship
 Newmarket

From Championship

Promoted to the Cork Senior Football Championship
 Clyda Rovers

Relegated to the Cork Intermediate Football Championship
 Kinsale

Results

Round 1

Round 2

Round 3

Relegation playoff

Round 4

Quarter-finals

Semi-finals

Final

Championship statistics

Top scorers

Overall

In a single game

References

Cork Premier Intermediate Football Championship